D. picta can refer to a number of different species.  The specific epithet  means 'painted.'

 Dejerosa picta, a spider found in Mozambique
 Dekeyseria picta, a species of armored catfish endemic to Brazil
 Delphinia picta, the picture-winged fly
 Desmiphora picta, a species of beetle in the family Cerambycidae
 Dichaea picta, an orchid
 Dieffenbachia picta, synonym for Dieffenbachia seguine, known as dumbcane
 Diplobatis picta, synonym for Diplobatis pictus, the painted electric ray
 Dirona picta, a sea slug known as colorful dirona
 Drasteria picta, a moth of the family Erebidae
 Drymoda picta, a synonym for the orchid Bulbophyllum drymoda
 Dysschema picta, synonym for Dysschema pictum, a moth found in Brazil